Greatest Hits Volume Two (or variants) may refer to any of the following albums:

Greatest Hits Vol. 2 (ABBA album) (1979)
Greatest Hits II (Clint Black album) (2001)
Greatest Hits, Vol. 2 (Johnny Cash album) (1971)
Greatest Hits II (Kenny Chesney album) (2009)
Greatest Hits, Volume II (Chicago album) (1981)
Greatest Hits Vol. II (Gloria Estefan album) (2001)
Greatest Hits, Vol. 2 (Marvin Gaye album) (1967)
Greatest Hits Volume II (Alan Jackson album) (2003)
Greatest Hits Volume II (1985) by Billy Joel
Greatest Hits Volume Two (The Judds album) (1991)
Greatest Hits 2 (Toby Keith album) (2004)
Greatest Hits Vol. II (Barry Manilow album) (1983)
Greatest Hits, Vol. 2 (The Miracles album) (1968) 
Greatest Hits Volume Two (Reba McEntire album) (1993)
Greatest Hits, Vol. 2 (Ronnie Milsap album) (1985)
Greatest Hits II (Queen album) (1991)
Greatest Hits, Volume 2 (Linda Ronstadt album) (1980)
Greatest Hits Volume Two (George Strait album) (1987)
Greatest Hits Volume 2 (James Taylor album) (2000)
Greatest Hits, Vol. 2 (Temptations album) (1970)
Greatest Hits, Volume 2 (Randy Travis album) (1992)
Greatest Hits Volume 2 (Hank Williams Jr. album) (1972)
Greatest Hits Volume II ("Weird Al" Yankovic album) (1994)
Greatest Hits 2 (Journey album) (2011)

It may also refer to other albums that include the phrase "Greatest Hits Volume Two":

The Greatest Hits – Volume 2: 20 More Good Vibrations (1999) by The Beach Boys
The Best of The Byrds: Greatest Hits, Volume II (1972)
John Denver's Greatest Hits, Volume 2 (1977)
Bob Dylan's Greatest Hits Vol. II (1971)
Eagles Greatest Hits, Vol. 2 (1982)
ELO's Greatest Hits Vol. 2 (1992) by Electric Light Orchestra
Al Green's Greatest Hits, Vol. 2 (1977)
Elton John's Greatest Hits Volume II (1977)
Olivia's Greatest Hits Vol. 2 (1982) by Olivia Newton-John
Frank Sinatra's Greatest Hits, Vol. 2 (1972)
Styx Greatest Hits Part 2 (1995)
Hank Williams, Jr.'s Greatest Hits, Vol. 2 (1985)

See also
List of greatest hits albums
Greatest hits
Greatest Hits Volume One (disambiguation)
Greatest Hits Volume Three (disambiguation)

Greatest Hits Volume 2